Osman Sonant (born 1 March 1979) is a Turkish actor.

He started his career in 1997 at Bahçelievler Municipal Theatre and was trained by Yılmaz Gruda. In 1998, he continued his career at Ortaoyuncular Nöbetçi Theatre run by Ferhan Şensoy and the next year he enrolled in Istanbul University State Conservatory and eventually graduated with a degree in stage arts studies. After appearing in various plays, movies and TV series, in 2009 he received the Best Supporting Actor award at the 16th Golden Boll Film Festival for his role in Pandora'nın Kutusu.

Since 2011, He is playing the character of Yavuz in the hit surreal comedy series Leyla ile Mecnun. In 2015, he had a leading role in Onur Ünlü's Beş Kardeş series, portraying the character of Orhan. Sonant has also appeared in the psychological thriller TV series Fi and in 2020 had a leading role in the Netflix historical docudrama Rise of Empires: Ottoman.

Filmography

Theatre
 Anna Karenina : Leo Tolstoy - Kent Oyuncuları - 2006
 The Night Season : Rebecca Lenkiewicz - Kent Oyuncuları - 2005
 Hamlet : William Shakespeare - Istanbul City Theatre - 2003

Discography

Awards
 23rd Ankara International Film Festival, "Best Actor" (Yangın Var) - 2012
 16th Golden Boll Film Festival, "Best Supporting Actor" (Pandora'nın Kutusu) - 2009

References

External links 
 
 

1979 births
Male actors from Istanbul
Turkish male film actors
Turkish male television actors
Turkish performance artists
Living people